Baatarkhuyagiin Otgonbold (born 20 December 1996) is a Mongolian archer. He competed in the men's individual event at the 2020 Summer Olympics.

References

External links
 

1996 births
Living people
Mongolian male archers
Olympic archers of Mongolia
Archers at the 2020 Summer Olympics
Place of birth missing (living people)
Archers at the 2018 Asian Games
21st-century Mongolian people